Live is the first live album by the American doom metal band Saint Vitus, recorded on November 10, 1989, at Germany's Circus Gammelsdorf. The album was released in 1990 on Hellhound Records. It was re-released by Southern Lord Records (SUNN43) in 2005. This was the final release to feature singer Scott "Wino" Weinrich until he rejoined Saint Vitus some years later, performing on their 2012 album Lillie: F-65.

Track listing
All songs written by Dave Chandler except where noted

 "Living Backwards" – 2:31
 "Born Too Late" (Chandler, Scott Reagers) - 7:12
 "The War Starter" - 7:29
 "Mind - Food" - 3:23
 "Looking Glass" - 5:12
 "White Stallions" - 5:52
 "Look Behind You" - 4:16
 "Dying Inside" - 9:00
 "War Is Our Destiny" (Chandler, Reagers) - 4:26
 "Mystic Lady" - 8:52
 "Clear Windowpane" - 8:32

Personnel
Saint Vitus
 Scott "Wino" Weinrich - vocals
 Dave Chandler - guitar
 Mark Adams - bass
 Armando Acosta - drums

Production
 Stephan Gross - producer, engineer
 Frits Veenstra - live sound engineer

References

Saint Vitus (band) albums
1990 live albums
Southern Lord Records live albums
Hellhound Records albums